Gioseffo Danedi (1618–1689) was an Italian painter of the late-Renaissance period.

He was born at Treviglio, and was the brother of Giovanni Stefano Danedi, and together, they were known as the Montalti. Both received instruction from the Milanese painter Pier Francesco Mazzucchelli (il Morazzone). Gioseffo painted in Turin and Milan, including a Murder of the Innocents in the church of San Sebastiano. He was influenced by Guido Reni. One of his pupils was Tarquinio Grassi.

References
Notes

Sources

1618 births
1689 deaths
People from Treviglio
17th-century Italian painters
Italian male painters
Italian Renaissance painters
Italian Baroque painters